Dog Hollow is a valley in the U.S. state of Missouri. Numerous hunting dogs in the valley caused the name Dog Hollow to be selected.

References

Valleys of McDonald County, Missouri
Valleys of Missouri